Levski Sofia entered season 2013–14 as runners-up in the Bulgarian A Football Group and finalists in the Bulgarian Cup. The Blues will celebrate their 100th anniversary during this season.

Summary

June,  July and August
In June 2013 after the dramatic end of the 2012–13 season Nikolay Mitov was appointed as the manager of the club. Mitov was previously in charge as a caretaker manager. He failed to win both the championship and cup despite not losing one single game. During the summer club's president announced the return of Nasko Sirakov as general manager of the club. Sirakov was fired from the position back in 2008. Under his lead and with the coaching of Mitov the team did not succeed in European Competitions and got kicked-out in the First Round of the Europa League from Kazakh side Irtysh Pavlodar with 0–2 on aggregate. This resulted the resignation of Mitov and on the 22nd of July Serbian coach Slaviša Jokanović was appointed as the new manager of the club. The failure in Europa League lead to the release of a few players like Cristovao Ramos, Ramon Lopes and striker Joao Silva.

Levski started the campaign with 2 lost games in-a-row against Botev Plovdiv and Lokomotiv Plovdiv finding themselves on last position. After two disappointing home draws against Beroe and Cherno More Varna the team signed with 5 new players – Larsen Touré, Alex Perez, Dimitar Makriev, Miroslav Ivanov and Goran Blažević. Insensibly the team started to improve in the Championship and got up in among the first 7.

September and October
The team's started to improve but another disappointing draw was made against Lokomotiv Sofia. This resulted the resignation of Slaviša Jokanović and the appointing of Ivaylo Petev as new coach on the 8 October. The fans reacted negatively to this change as earlier in the season they stated their support towards Jokanovic. On the presentation of Petev some of the fans interrupted the press conference and announced that they will not accept Petev as new coach because of his sympathy to Levski's biggest rival CSKA Sofia and got him kicked out. On the next day Petev refused to take Levski's job   while general managers Nasko Sirakov and Ivo Tonev also resigned after the events leaving ex-player Hristo Yovov as the only manager in the club. Tonev though made a promise to finish the construction of the main stand of the stadium which was started in February 2013 and was scheduled to be completed in May 2014 for the 100th anniversary. However, later it was reported that due to financial troubles the construction will be delayed and the stand won't be opened for the anniversary. Meanwhile, Antoni Zdravkov was put in charge of the team. 10 days after these events the team lost heavily the Eternal Derby from CSKA with 0:3.

November and December

Despite the heavy loss Zdravkov and his assistants Marian Hristov and Elin Topuzakov managed to rebuild the squad and the team won 8 out of 10 next games. Levski managed to beat Pirin Gotse Delchev in the Bulgarian Cup Second Round with 9–0 on aggregate drawing with fierce rivals CSKA in the Third Round. At the end of December the team knocked-out CSKA after two goalless draw and a 7–6 victory over penalties. The Blues qualified for the Quarterfinals of the tournament where they will play Botev Plovdiv. During the winter break medias reported that key player Garry Rodrigues will be sold to title competitors Ludogorets Razgrad. However, after a meeting between club's boss Todor Batkov and fans the deal didn't went through.

January and February
After New Year's Eve the team found himself placed on 3rd position. However, due to financial crisis a few players were sold and released. Young star Antonio Vutov was sold to Serie A-side Udinese  while key player Garry Rodrigues was transferred to Primera División-side Elche CF. The total income of both transfers is reported to be more than 1 million euros. Other players like Dimitar Vezalov, Alex Perez, Yordan Miliev and Ilian Yordanov were released from the club.

In the other way around a total of 5 new players arrived. In the beginning of January Levski signed with Lyubimets captain Anton Ognyanov and with central defender Aymen Belaid from Lokomotiv Plovdiv as well. The estimated fee of both transfers was undisclosed. Afterwards the club signed also with another defender Pavel Čmovš coming from Eredivisie side NEC Nijmegen. On the last day of January Levski signed also with Beroe's Plamen Krumov and with Bulgarian international striker Valeri Bojinov.

Levski started their preparation for the second part of the season with two camps. The first one was held in Sozopol, a city on the Bulgarian coast. The squad played one friendly game against Chernomorets Burgas which was won 5:3. The goals were scored by Larsen Toure (hat-trick), youngster Borislav Tsonev and the new signing Anton Ognyanov. In the beginning of February the team continued with the preparation with another camp in Cyprus. On Cypriot soil The Blues played 5 more friendly games in total. They started with 3 losses from Russian side Mordovia Saransk, Czech champions Viktoria Plzeň and another side from the Czech Republic Teplice. Levski lost against the Mordovia with 1:2 with a goal scored from penalty and 2:4 from Teplice with Valeri Bojinov and Miroslav Ivanov scoring. In their 3rd exhibition game against Viktoria Plzeň the team lost 0:3 after a very disappointing performance from the referee of the game. In the 2nd minute of the match Anton Ognyanov was heavily injured by Tomáš Wágner. Ognyanov was taken to the hospital where it was confirmed that his ankle is fractured and will treat it for the next 3 months which will force him to miss the rest of the season. For the challenge Wagner didn't receive a card. 10 minutes after the incident the Czech side opened the score in the game after a handball which was not noticed from the referee.

The team finished their preparation with 2 draws against Lithuanian champions Žalgiris and Russian side Ural Sverdlovsk. Both games ended 1:1. Levski finished their preparation with only 1 win out of 6 matches. Between the last 2 games Levski signed with another played following the heavy injury of Anton Ognyanov. Brazilian playmaker Rafael Bastos came on the 12 February and started to train individually in order to catch up with the squad. On the 17 February Bastos signed for 1 year with Levski. 2 days before the renewal of the championship the team signed with another player. Left-back Ricardo Nunes agreed on a 1.5-year deal with the club. Levski renewed the Bulgarian league fixtures on the 22 February with a home draw game against Slavia Sofia. The match ended 2–2 and 2 days after it the club signed with another played. Portuguese winger Cristóvão Ramos returned to the team after playing from 2012 to 2013. The contract will be until the end of the season.

Despite the new signings Levski suffered another loss. This time the Blues lost from Lokomotiv Sofia with 0:1. Few days after the match chairman Todor Batkov decided to fire Sports director Hristo Yovov and assistant coach Marian Hristov. Both club legends were surprised by the decision.

March, April and May
Despite all the changes no head coach was appointed and on 8 March Levski lost the Eternal derby against CSKA Sofia with 0–1. This was the first time in 27 years when Levski losses 2 derby games in the same season. One week after the last round from the Regular season Levski had to play again with CSKA and lost one more with a late goal scored by Plamen Krachunov. In the meantime the team got eliminated from the Bulgarian Cup Quarterfinals from Botev Plovdiv. Despite winning with 3:1 in the First Leg the team lost the re-match with 0:2 and got knocked-out 3:3 on aggregate and more away goals. This resulted the resignation of Antoni Zdravkov and started a war between the fans and the club owner Todor Batkov. Club icon Elin Topuzakov was appointed as the new head coach of the team until the end of the season helped by another ex-played Viktorio Pavlov. This season will be the 5th in-a-row in which the Blues will not manage to win a trophy. Topuzakov lead the team to 3 wins in-a-row. Both Plovdiv sides Botev and Lokomotiv were beaten by 2-0 followed by another 1–0 win against Cherno More Varna in Sofia.

Despite the run of positive results the club registered 3 more losses in the next 3 games. The team lost 0-2 from Ludogorets in Razgrad, 1-2 from Litex Lovech in Sofia and 1–3 in the derby against CSKA Sofia. This was the 4th loss in-a-row in a derby game which never happened before. With only 5 games remaining Levski Sofia find themselves placed on 5th position with slight chance of achieving a qualification to UEFA competitions for the next season. It is most likely that the club will not participate in a European competition for the first time since 1990–91 season.

Following the derby loss Levski lost again in Plovdiv against Botev which made it the 4th lost game in-a-row which is a record for the club. Only in 4 other season Levski had managed to lose 4 games in-a-row. Those occasions happened in 1940, 1952, 1955 and 1960.

After the negative series of results Levski finished the season with 3 wins out of 4 games. Away victories were achieved against Cherno More and Litex while at home the Blues managed to win once against Loko Plovdiv and lost their last home game of the season against running champions Ludogorets. Levski finished in 5th place with 14 lost matches (club record for one season). For the first time since season 1990–91 Levski will not participate in European competitions.

On 23 May 2014 Levski ended the season with an anniversary game against Italian side SS Lazio. The game was entirely organised by the fans who made contact with the Italian club and raised funds for all the events that occurred around the friendly match. 160 sportsmen and footballers were awarded from the fans for their achievements with the sports club during the last 100 years. New sports director Georgi Ivanov, Aleksandar Aleksandrov, Elin Topuzakov, Hristo Yovov and other icons from the near past took participation in the football match against Lazio. The match ended 3–2 after Lazio took advantage with 0–2 in the first half. After the break Levski made a comeback with a brace by Dimitar Makriev and a wonderful winning goal scored by 15-year-old youngster from the Academy Stanislav Ivanov. At midnight the whole stadium was lighten up with flares and fireworks.

On 24 May 2014 the celebrations continued with a ceremony on Mogilkata, a square in the center of Sofia where in 1914 the club was founded by a group of students from the near school. After the ceremony the fans started a parade through the entire city centre and ended up at the monument of the patron of the club Vasil Levski.

Transfers

Summer transfers

In:

Out:

See List of Bulgarian football transfers summer 2013

Winter transfers

In:

Out:

Squad

Updated on 22 May 2014.

Statistics

Goalscorers

Assists

Cards

Pre-season and friendlies

Friendly game for the 100th year anniversary

Summer

Winter

Competitions

Overall

A Group

First phase

Results summary

Results by round

Matches

Championship group

Results summary

Results by round

Matches

Bulgarian Cup

First round

Levski advanced to Second Round.

Second round

Levski advanced to Quarterfinals.

Quarterfinal

Europa League

First qualifying round

References

PFC Levski Sofia seasons
Levski Sofia